Been All Around This World is an album of acoustic collaboration between Jerry Garcia and David Grisman, released in 2004.

Track listing
 "Been All Around this World" (Traditional)
 "I'll Go Crazy" (James Brown)
 "Take Me" (George Jones/Leon Payne)
 "Handsome Cabin Boy Waltz" (Traditional)
 "The Ballad of Frankie Lee and Judas Priest" (Bob Dylan)
 "I'm Troubled" (Traditional)
 "Blue Yodel #9" (Jimmie Rodgers)
 "Nine Pound Hammer" (Merle Travis)
 "I Ain't Never" (Michael Pierce/Mel Tillis)
 "Sittin' Here in Limbo" (Plummer Bright/James Chambers)
 "Dark as a Dungeon" (Merle Travis)
 "Drink up and go Home" (Freddie Hart)

Personnel
 David Grisman – mandolin
 Jerry Garcia – guitar, vocals
 Joe Craven – violin, percussion, vocals
 Matt Eakle – flute
 John Kahn – bass
 Jim Kerwin – bass
 George Marsh – drums
 Sally Van Meter – Dobro

References

Jerry Garcia albums
David Grisman albums
2004 albums
Acoustic Disc albums
Collaborative albums